Lists of Italian actors are split by gender.

 List of Italian actresses
 List of Italian actors

Italian